So There may refer to

So There (Ben Folds album), an album by Ben Folds
"So There", a song by Ben Folds off the eponymous album So There
So There, album by Steve Swallow
"So There", song by Alexa Goddard
"So There", song by 4PK 1966

See also

 
 There (disambiguation)
 So (disambiguation)